Věnceslava or Vjenceslava is a Czech feminine given name. The male version of name is Václav meaning more glory. Pronounced vyehn-ses-lah-vah. Věnka means crown in a modern Czech language.

The Czech name day is 13 February. Derived nicknames include: Vjenka, Vjena, Vjenuška, Slávka, Venca, Vendy

Other variants 
Venceslava - Serbo-Croatian, Bulgarian, Russian
Wienczysława - Polish
Vienka - English

External links 
Věštírna
Děti jména
Behind the Name

Czech feminine given names
Slavic feminine given names